Eurybia radulina (formerly Aster radulinus), commonly known as the roughleaf aster, is an herbaceous perennial in the family Asteraceae. It is native to western North America, where it is present primarily west of the Cascade Range in both Canada (British Columbia including Vancouver Island) and the United States (Washington, Oregon, and California including the Channel Islands). Its habitats include dry rock outcrops, slopes, edges of forests, and oak woodlands.

References

External links
 
 
 Paul Slichter,  Asters Found East of the Cascade Mt. Crest of Oregon and Washington,  Rough-leaved Aster, Eurybia radulina

Plants described in 1872
Flora of the West Coast of the United States
Flora of British Columbia
radulina